The New York comptroller election of 2010 involved the first election campaign of Democrat Thomas DiNapoli to the Office of State Comptroller. DiNapoli was appointed as Comptroller by a joint session of the New York State Legislature on February 7, 2007. In the general election on November 2, 2010, DiNapoli defeated Republican nominee Harry Wilson.

Candidates

Democratic Party
Thomas DiNapoli, incumbent New York State Comptroller

Republican Party
Harry Wilson

Green Party
Julia Willebrand

Libertarian Party
John Gaetani

Polling

Democratic primary

General election

General election

External links
 New York State Office of the Comptroller, osc.state.ny.us

References

Comptroller
2010
New York